Gilbert White (1720–1793) was a pioneering English naturalist and ornithologist.

Gilbert White may also refer to:
 Gilbert White (bishop) (1859–1933), Bishop of Carpentaria, Australia, and poet
 Gilbert White (painter) (1877–1939), American painter
 Gilbert F. White (1911–2006), American geographer
 Gilbert White (British Army officer) (1912–1977), English cricketer and British Army officer